The , sometimes referred to by its abbreviated Japanese name of , is a prefectural museum of natural history in Sanda, Hyōgo Prefecture, Japan. The museum opened in 1992. The collection includes many geological and biological specimens.

See also
 Biological type specimens reposed at Hitohaku
 Hyōgo Prefectural Museum of Archaeology

References

External links
  Museum of Nature and Human Activities, Hyōgo
  Museum of Nature and Human Activities, Hyōgo

Museums in Hyōgo Prefecture
Natural history museums in Japan
Sanda, Hyōgo
Museums established in 1992
1992 establishments in Japan
Prefectural museums